"Good Thing" is a song by American rapper Sage the Gemini featuring vocals from Nick Jonas. It was released on May 18, 2015, via Republic Records as the intended lead single from the former's upcoming second studio album Bachelor Party. The song peaked at number 75 on the Billboard Hot 100.

Background
An early version of the song leaked online on April 4, 2015. Talking about the collaboration, Jonas said that it was a "great next step for his career", hoping for the song to become a successful summer hit. The song was eventually released in explicit and clean versions on May 18, 2015. The song appeared on the re-release of Nick Jonas' 2014 self-titled album, Nick Jonas X2.

Music video
The music video for the song was shot in early May 2015 in Los Angeles and received its premiere via complex.com on May 21, 2015, being added to Vevo shortly afterwards. Directed by Hannah Lux Davis. the video takes an exotic approach, where Woods and Jonas are prominently featured in a lush, tropical backdrop, surrounded by models.

Reception
Christina Lee of Idolator wrote that "the song proves that Sage the Gemini can write a smash hit if he wants". Rapup.com called the song "seductive", adding that the rappers rhymes are heartfelt. while Nick delivers a soulful hook. Brendan V van DJbooth said that "even though the rapper is the headliner of the collaboration, the song is mostly commanded by the Jonas brother, as you’ll hear a lot of his crooning over the roaring synthercizers". Vibe's Mia V. praised Nick's strong R&B vocals while the rapper switched it up with a silky smooth sixteen. MTV's Madeline Roth called the song "the perfect summer song with plenty of spellbinding rhymes and soulful refrain".

Live performance
Sage the Gemini and Nick Jonas performed the song during the July 23 episode of The Tonight Show Starring Jimmy Fallon. Nick performed the song live during his Live in Concert tour. He also performed the song during We Can Survive 2015. The song is part of the setlist of the Future Now Tour.

Track listings
Digital download
"Good Thing"  – 3:46

Digital download
"Good Thing"  – 3:46

Charts

Release history

References

2015 singles
2015 songs
Sage the Gemini songs
Republic Records singles
Nick Jonas songs
Music videos directed by Hannah Lux Davis
Songs written by Savan Kotecha
Songs written by Peter Svensson
Songs written by Ilya Salmanzadeh
Song recordings produced by Ilya Salmanzadeh
Songs written by Sage the Gemini